The Parliament of British Columbia is made of two elements: the King in Right of British Columbia, represented by the lieutenant governor, and the Legislative Assembly of British Columbia (which meets at the British Columbia Parliament Buildings). The Parliament of British Columbia has existed since the province joined Canada in 1871, before which it was preceded by the Parliament of the United Colony of British Columbia.

Like the Canadian federal government, British Columbia uses a Westminster-style parliamentary government, in which members are sent to the Legislative Assembly after general elections and from there the party with the most seats chooses a Premier of British Columbia and Executive Council of British Columbia.  The premier acts as British Columbia's head of government, while the King of Canada in Right of British Columbia acts as its head of state and is represented by the lieutenant governor of British Columbia. Before 1903, candidates in British Columbia elections were not affiliated with political parties.

List of Parliaments
Following is a list of the 42 times the Parliament has been convened since 1871. This article only covers the time since 1871. For the governing body from 1867 to 1871, see Legislative Council of British Columbia.

Notes:

References